Ram Govind Chaudhary (born 9 July 1946) is one of the prominent socialist leaders of India who has served as the Leader of the Opposition in the Uttar Pradesh Legislative Assembly from 2017 to 2022. He was in charge of Basic Education and Child Nutrition and Development Ministries in previous Samajwadi Party Government of Uttar Pradesh led by Akhilesh Yadav. He is Member of Legislative Assembly of Uttar Pradesh from the Bansdih assembly seat, Ballia. 

He had closely worked with Jayaprakash Narayan and Chandra Shekhar. He is one of the close associates of Samajwadi Party president Mulayam Singh Yadav.

Early life and education
Chaudhary was born on 9 July 1946 in Gosaipur, Ballia, Uttar Pradesh to Dwarika Choudhary. In 1974, he got Bachelor of Arts degree from Gorakhpur University, and in 1982, he received a degree in LLB from Lucknow University.

Political career
Chaudhary has been MLA for eight terms. 1977 to 1992 he represented Chilkahar constituency in Ballia of Uttar Pradesh. Since 2002, he represented Bansdih (Assembly constituency) in Ballia as a member of Samajwadi Party. He was also 	Minister of Horticulture and Food Processing in Mulayam Singh Yadav	cabinet (1990-91) and Minister of Child Development and Nutrition, Basic Education in Mulayam Singh Yadav cabinet (2003-07) and Akhilesh Yadav cabinet (2012-17). 

Since March 2017, he serves as Leader of opposition in Seventeenth Legislative Assembly of Uttar Pradesh, as a leader of Samajwadi Party.

Posts held
 1977-1980
 Member, 7th Legislative Assembly of Uttar Pradesh (First Term)
Member, Estimate Committee
1980-1985
 Member, 8th Legislative Assembly of Uttar Pradesh (Second Term)
1985-1989
Member, 9th Legislative Assembly of Uttar Pradesh (Third Term)
Whip, Janata Party Legislature Party
 Member, Joint Committee on Welfare of Scheduled Caste, Scheduled Tribes and Denotified Tribes
1989-1991
Member, 10th Legislative Assembly of Uttar Pradesh (Fourth Term)
 Minister, Horticulture and Food Processing (Mulayam Singh Yadav Cabinet)
Member, Joint Committee on Welfare of Scheduled Castes Scheduled Tribes and Denotified Tribes
Member, Question & Reference Committee
1991-1992
Member, 11th Legislative Assembly of Uttar Pradesh (Fifth Term)
2002-2007
Member, 14th Legislative Assembly of Uttar Pradesh (Sixth Term)
Minister, Child Development and Nutrition (Mulayam Singh Yadav Cabinet)
Member, Joint Committee on Public Undertakings and Corporations
2012-2017
Member, 16th Legislative Assembly of Uttar Pradesh (Seventh Term)
Minister, Child Development and Nutrition, Basic Education, Social Welfare and Panchayati Raj (Akhilesh Yadav Cabinet)
2017-2022
Member, 17th Legislative Assembly of Uttar Pradesh (Eighth Term)
Leader of Opposition in Legislative Assembly of Uttar Pradesh.

Personal life
He is married to Kalawati Devi. They have a son.

References

Living people
Samajwadi Party politicians
Uttar Pradesh MLAs 2017–2022
1953 births
Leaders of the Opposition in the Uttar Pradesh Legislative Assembly
University of Lucknow alumni
Deen Dayal Upadhyay Gorakhpur University alumni
Samajwadi Janata Party politicians
Janata Dal politicians
Jharkhand Party politicians